This is a list of defunct airlines of Guinea.

See also

 List of airlines of Guinea
 List of airports in Guinea

References

Guinea
Airlines
Airlines, defunct